Cosmopterix plesiasta is a moth of the family Cosmopterigidae. It is known from Thailand and India.

References

plesiasta